The Maybach Mb IVa was a water-cooled aircraft and airship straight-six engine developed in Germany during World War I by Maybach-Motorenbau GmbH, a subsidiary of Zeppelin. It was one of the world's first series-produced engines designed specifically for high-altitude use. It was quite different engine design than the previous Maybach Mb.IV, not just a simple modification.

Design and development 
Like all engines of that time, the previous Maybach design, the Mb IV, lost at high altitude as much as half of the nominal power of 240 horsepower. The new Maybach Mb IVa of 1916 was the first engine designed to overcome this limitation.  It did not use a supercharger, but a much more primitive solution. The engine had purposely "oversized" cylinders, and a significantly higher 6.08:1 compression ratio. It was tested on Wendelstein (mountain)  at an altitude of 1800 m and rated there at 245 hp. This would theoretically correspond to rating of about 300 hp at sea level; however, the engine was not designed to withstand such power - it needed to be carefully throttled down at low altitude, so it would not exceed the safe level of 245 hp. It had three carburettor settings, to be changed during the flight depending on the altitude.

Applications

During the First World War
 Friedrichshafen G.V (one built)
 Gotha G.VIII (one built)
 Gotha G.IX
 Gotha WD.8
 Hansa-Brandenburg W.29
 LFG Roland G.I
 Rumpler C.VII
 Zeppelin airships, beginning with LZ 105 up to LZ 114
 Zeppelin-Lindau Rs.III
 Zeppelin-Lindau Rs.IV
 Zeppelin-Staaken R.VI
 Zeppelin-Staaken R.XIV
 Zeppelin-Staaken R.XV

After the First World War
 Aero A.10
 Albatros L 58
 Heinkel HE 1
 FVM S 21
 Kawanishi K-7 Transport Seaplane
 Fizir F1V-Maybach

Other Maybach engines
The earlier Maybach engines were:
Maybach AZ of 1909:   
Maybach CX of 1915:  
Maybach DW and IR of 1914:  
Maybach HS (there was a variant HSLu, known also as HS-Lu) of 1915:   
Maybach Mb III - a new designation for the existing Maybach IR engine 
Maybach Mb IV - a new designation for the existing Maybach HS engine

The power ratings for these older engines are at sea level, unlike the rating of the Mb IVa.

Specifications (Mb.IVa)

See also

References

Further reading

Maybach engines
1910s aircraft piston engines
Airship engines